June Tomiak (born 8 February 1997) is a German politician, currently serving as Member of the Abgeordnetenhaus of Berlin since the 2016 election as a statewide member representing Alliance 90/The Greens.

Personal life
Tomiak was born in Berlin and grew up in Soldiner Kiez in Wedding. She describes her family life as "patchwork and rainbow". She received her Abitur qualification at Gottfried-Keller-Gymnasium. Alongside her political roles Tomiak studies culture and technology with a focus on philosophy at TU Berlin.

Career
Prior to entering state politics Tomiak involved in school and borough politics. She was first elected in 2016 at the age of 19, as the youngest member of the Abgeordnetenhaus.

Tomiak is the Greens spokesperson for youth policy and strategies against right-wing extremism.

Tomiak describers herself as an anti-fascist and an intersectional feminist.

References

Living people
1997 births
Alliance 90/The Greens politicians
German anti-fascists
German feminists
Members of the Abgeordnetenhaus of Berlin
Women members of State Parliaments in Germany
People from Mitte